Acrobasis rufizonella is a species of snout moth in the genus Acrobasis. It was described by Émile Louis Ragonot in 1887, and is known from south-eastern Siberia, Japan and Taiwan.

The wingspan is 22 mm.

References

Moths described in 1887
Acrobasis
Moths of Asia